Lobelia hereroensis is a species of plant in the family Campanulaceae. It is endemic to Namibia.  It is threatened by habitat loss.

References

Flora of Namibia
hereroensis
Vulnerable plants
Taxonomy articles created by Polbot